Vaqaye-e Ettefaqiyeh (Persian: وقایع اتفاقیه) was a weekly published newspaper in Qajar Iran.

Its first issue was published on 7 February 1851 on the orders of Amir Kabir and was printed by lithography.

References 

Newspapers published in Iran